Podigrac is a dispersed settlement in the Municipality of Kungota in northeastern Slovenia, right on the border with Austria.

References

External links
Podigrac on Geopedia

Populated places in the Municipality of Kungota